The 2005–06 Iraqi Premier League kicked off on October 28, 2005. The 28 teams were split into four groups of seven. At the end of the group stage, the top three teams from each group (a total of 12 teams) advanced to the Elite Stage. In the Elite Stage, these 12 teams were split into four groups of three, with teams playing home and away against each team in their group respectively. The top team in each of the four groups moved on to the semi-finals, followed by a third place match and the final. Al-Zawraa won the league without losing a match.

Group stage

North Group

Central Group 1

Central Group 2

South Group

Elite stage

Group 1

Group 2

Group 3

Group 4

Golden stage

Semi-finals

First legs

Second legs

Al-Najaf won 5–2 on aggregate

Al-Zawraa won 3–1 on aggregate

Third place match

Final

Match officials
Assistant referees:
Sabhan Ahmed
Ali Zaidan

Match rules
90 minutes.
30 minutes of extra-time if necessary.
Penalty shootout if scores still level.

Final positions

Season statistics

Top scorers

Hat-tricks

References

External links
 Iraq Football Association

Iraqi Premier League seasons
1
Iraq